Lyft, Inc. offers mobility as a service, ride-hailing, vehicles for hire, motorized scooters, a bicycle-sharing system, rental cars, and food delivery in the United States and select cities in Canada. Lyft sets fares, which vary using a dynamic pricing model based on local supply and demand at the time of the booking and are quoted to the customer in advance, and receives a commission from each booking. Lyft is the second-largest ridesharing company in the United States after Uber.

History

Lyft was launched in the summer of 2012 by computer programmers Logan Green and John Zimmer as a service of Zimride, a long-distance intercity carpooling company focused on college transport that they founded in 2007 after Green shared rides from the University of California, Santa Barbara campus to visit his girlfriend in Los Angeles and was seeking an easier way to share rides.

In May 2013, the company made the decision to change its name from Zimride to Lyft. Later that year, Lyft sold the original Zimride service to Enterprise Holdings, the parent company of Enterprise Rent-A-Car, to enable the company to focus exclusively on the growth of Lyft.

Lyft's marketing strategy included large pink furry mustaches that drivers attached to the front of their cars and encouraging riders to sit in the front seat and fist bump with drivers upon meeting. In November 2014, the company distanced itself from the fist bump. In January 2015, Lyft introduced a small, glowing plastic dashboard mustache it called a "glowstache" as an alternative to the large fuzzy mustaches on the front of cars. The transition was to help overcome the resistance of some riders to arrive at destinations, such as business meetings, in a car with a giant mustache.

In April 2014, Lyft hired two lobbying firms, TwinLogic Strategies, and Jochum Shore & Trossevin, to address the regulatory barriers and opposition it had received since its launch. Due to regulatory hurdles in New York City, the company altered its business model when establishing Lyft on the East Coast of the United States. Lyft's launch in New York City occurred on the evening of July 25, 2014, and, by the Taxi and Limousine Commission (TLC) and the approval of the Manhattan Supreme Court, only drivers registered with the TLC were permitted to drive Lyft-branded vehicles in New York City.

In August 2014, the company introduced a shared ride concept, which provides cheaper fares.

In December 2017, Lyft expanded into Canada, with operations in the Toronto, Hamilton and Ottawa metropolitan areas.

In March 2018, Lyft partnered with Allscripts to create a platform allowing healthcare providers to arrange rides for patients who lack transportation to appointments. The service would be available to 2,500 hospitals, 180,000 physicians, and approximately 7 million patients. Lyft acquired Motivate, a bicycle-sharing system and the operator of Capital Bikeshare and Citi Bike, in November 2018. The company also announced plans to add 28,000 Citi Bikes and expand its service.

In March 2019, Lyft became a public company via an initial public offering, raising $2.34 billion at a valuation of $24.3 billion. The company set aside some shares to be given to long-time drivers.

In March 2020, Lyft acquired Halo Cars which pays drivers to display digital advertisements on their vehicles. In April 2020, Lyft laid off 982 employees and furloughed an additional 288 to reduce operating expenses and adjust cash flows due to the COVID-19 pandemic in the United States. The company continued to offer scooters for rent in San Francisco, while Miami government asked Lyft to halt operations.

In August 2020, Lyft partnered with rental car company Sixt to let users access rental cars. Most of the rental cars are owned and operated by Sixt, with 85 locations in the US. Lyft receives commissions from rentals.

In December 2020, Lyft announced plans to launch a multi-city U.S. robotaxi service in 2023 with Motional. Lyft sold its self-driving car division to Toyota for $550 million in April 2021. The division had partnerships with General Motors, NuTonomy, Ford Motor Company, GoMentum Station, and Magna International. It also owned Blue Vision Labs, a London-based augmented reality startup, acquired in 2018 for $72 million.

In April 2022, Lyft announced an agreement to acquire PBSC Urban Solutions, a Canadian bike-share equipment and technology supplier. In November 2022, the company announced layoffs of approximately 700 employees, or about 13% of its staff.

Criticism

Legality of ride sharing
The legality of ridesharing companies by jurisdiction varies; in some areas they have been banned and are considered to be illegal taxicab operations.

Unwanted text messages
In November 2018, Lyft settled a class action suit filed in 2014 alleging that the company had sent large numbers of unwanted commercial text messages. In addition to $4 million in payments to consumers, the plaintiffs sought $1 million in legal fees.

See also
 Ride sharing privacy

References

External links

 

 
Transport companies established in 2012
2012 establishments in California
2019 initial public offerings
Android (operating system) software
Companies based in San Francisco
Companies listed on the Nasdaq
IOS software
Location-based software
Ridesharing companies of the United States